The Passion Trust is a registered charity that supports the resurgence of Passion Plays in the United Kingdom. Its avowed aim is to keep alive the heritage of dramatic re-enactments of the Easter story. Passion Plays take place in over 50 different locations in the UK, each adapted to the local community and the volunteers who perform and produce the plays. As reported in Christianity Today, the purpose of Passion Plays is to bring the Gospel message to life within communities and trustees of the Passion Trust support these local communities in the UK.

History
The Passion Trust was established in 2011 to support Passion Plays taking place in the UK, and acts as a centre for resourcing, financing and equipping community performances to keep the dramatic, story-telling heritage of religious drama alive for future generations. It also advocates for public drama through local and national media. The resurgence of Passion Plays in the UK led to the creation of the Passion Trust.

Trustees and supporters of the Passion Trust have been involved in Passion Plays all over the world, from Australia to Cape Town. Passion Plays have also been performed by prisoners in jails including at Louisiana State Penitentiary (2012)  where seventy-five inmates at Angola Prison and Louisiana Correctional Institution for Women (LCIW) came together to put on a performance of the Passion. The performance was the subject of a documentary that shows scenes from the daily lives of the inmates together with scenes from the play that is performed in the prison grounds. Other Passion Plays in prisons include those performed in HM Prison Greenock in Glasgow and jails in Milan and Brazil where Jesus was crucified on the prison bars.

Activity

The Passion Trust hosts an annual conference attended by actors, arts practitioners, producers, directors, fundraisers and journalists. It also disseminates information for people starting new Passion Plays or wanting to develop existing plays, including script-writing, fund-raising, working with local councils and engaging with local communities.

Keynote speakers at Passion Trust conferences include:
 Israel Oyelumade. Oyelumade played Jesus in Winchester's Passion Play in 2006 and was head of Character Development for Love Beyond, a musical based on the Bible story with vocal performances from West End stars and one of the biggest live orchestras of any musical theatre show in London. He is known for his work on Pirates of the Caribbean: The Curse of the Black Pearl (2003), Pirates of the Caribbean: Dead Man's Chest (2006) and Exorcist: The Beginning (2004).
 James Burke-Dunsmore. Burke-Dunsmore is a writer, director and actor who has played Jesus for over 17 years. He regularly performs in Trafalgar Square, Guildford and Wintershall.
 Sir Jack Stewart-Clark. Sir Jack facilitates Passion Plays in Scotland and internationally, most notably in Louisiana State Penitentiary and in Rwanda. In 2016, Stewart-Clark gained approval from the Vatican to take a Passion Play, dramatising the last days of Christ, to the Opera Jail in Milan, Italy. Stewart-Clark has said: "[Prisoners] can become redeemed in prison, even if you’re never getting out". It was reported that Archbishop Leo Cushley was supportive of this project.
 Suzanne Lofthus. Lofthus is a director with years of experience directing Passion Plays in local communities and in prisons, as well as the Edinburgh Passion Play which was described in The Scotsman as 'strikingly well-choreographed production'. She directs the annual open air promenade Easter Play in Princes Street Gardens, Edinburgh and is working towards a large scale, multi-art form performance over Easter weekend 2020.  
 Peter Hutley. Hutley is the producer of the Nativity Play, Passion Play and Life of Christ plays that were performed on the Wintershall Estate by the Wintershall Players. Hutley has been awarded an OBE for his charitable work and is also a Knight of St. Gregory. 
 Professor Helen Bond. Professor Bond is a British Professor of Christian Origins and New Testament.
 Professor Jolyon Mitchell. Professor Mitchell specialises in Religion, Violence and Peacebuilding, with particular reference to the arts. Mitchell worked as a Producer and Journalist at BBC World Service before moving to the University of Edinburgh.
 Sharon Muiruri. Muiruri was artistic director of the Poole Passion and wrote the Passion Play tiled 'Through the Eyes of a Child'. 
 Alexander Stewart-Clark. The founding trustee of the Passion Trust, he has been involved in Passion Plays for over 20 years, acting in them, fundraising and supporting them.  He is responsible for inspiring a large number of professional directors, actors and producers to start up new Passion Plays around the UK. He is also involved in a number of charities helping ex-offenders, orphans, and community art schemes. 
 Charlotte de Klee is Producer of the Wintershall plays, including the Passion of Christ held every Easter in Trafalgar Square.  She has been involved in producing & setting up community plays in Scotland for about 20 years, which have played to thousands with casts of up to 100.
 Neil Maddock. Maddock played Jesus in a Passion Play in Southampton in 2011. Nearly 10,000 people watched a re-enactment of the Easter story performed by more than 70 amateur actors, dancers and a 100-strong choir in Guildhall Square.

International Links

The Passion Trust connects UK Passion Plays with Europassion, a large European organisation that promotes Passion Plays in Europe. Established in 1982, this umbrella organisation draws together Passion Play communities from countries all over Europe, some of which have been performing their plays for hundreds of years. Over 80 Passion groups from 16 countries are represented there.

According to Mons. Fausto Panfili, the Chaplain of the Europassion:

The experience of the Europassion constantly lets us experience a so far unexplored pathway, so that we can continue to grow. Surmounting a self-referred vision of our own experience obligates us to confront a regional, national, European and universal horizon. That is why a new vision, not fragmentary, is necessary. Unity doesn’t mean uniformity. A spiritual energy, stronger and more attentive to cultural elaboration, a more evident solidarity in order to be recognised as bearers of hope, to help the people and communities grow.

References

External links
Official Website

Cultural organisations based in the United Kingdom
Organizations established in 2011
2011 establishments in the United Kingdom